SNLF can refer to:

Japanese Special Naval Landing Forces
Sandinista National Liberation Front